No. 32 Squadron ( or LLv.32, from 3 May 1942 Le.Lv.32), renamed No. 32 Fighter Squadron (Finnish: Hävittäjälentolaivue 32 or HLe.Lv.32 on 14 February 1944) was a fighter squadron of the Finnish Air Force during World War II. The squadron was part of Flying Regiment 1. The squadron was formed from the disbanded No. 22 Squadron.

Organization

Continuation War
1st Flight (1. Lentue)
Detachment H (Osasto H)
2nd Flight (2. Lentue)
3rd Flight (3. Lentue)
Detachment Kalaja (Osasto Kalaja)
1st Flight of No. 24 Squadron (1./HLe.Lv.24)

The equipment consisted of 35 Fokker D.XXIs, 4 Hawker Hurricane Is, 18 Curtiss Hawk 75As, and 2 Lavochkin LaGG-3s.

Bibliography

External links
Lentolaivue 32

32